Big Breasts and Wide Hips is a novel by Mo Yan. It won the Dajia Honghe Literature Prize in 1997. The book tells the story of a mother and her eight daughters and one son, and explores Chinese history through the 20th century. The novel enthusiastically praises the original creator of life—the greatness, simplicity and selflessness of the mother, and the unparalleled significance of the inheritance of life. And in this flow chart of life, filled with the smoke of history and war, it is true, without any prejudice, and reproduces the history of a period of time. In 1997, Big Breasts and Fat Hips won China's Master Literature Award.

Characters
Shangguan Lushi, the mother
Shangguan Laidi, Eldest Sister, daughter of Lushi and Big Paw. Married to Sha Yueliang. Mother of Sha Zaohua.
Shangguan Zhaodi, Second Sister, daughter of Lushi and Big Paw. Married to Sima Ku. Mother of twins, Sima Feng and Sima Huang.
Shangguan Lingdi, Third Sister, also known as Bird Fairy. Daughter of Lushi and a peddler of ducks. First wife of Speechless Sun. Mother of Big Mute and Little Mute.
Shangguan Xiangdi, Forth Sister, daughter of Lushi and a doctor. Sold herself to a brothel during the famine in order to save her family.
Shangguan Pandi, Fifth Sister, daughter of Lushi and a butcher. Married to Lu Liren. Mother of Lu Shengli. Later changed her name to Ma Ruilian.
Shangguan Niandi, Sixth Sister, daughter of Lushi and a monk. Married to the American pilot Barbitt. 
Shangguan Qiudi, Seventh Sister. Lushi gave birth to her after raped by deserts. Adopted by a Russian Duchess. 
Shangguan Yunü, Eighth Sister, blind, daughter of Lushi and the Swedish missionary Maloja.
Shangguan Jintong, 'me' in the novel, son of Lushi and Maloja. Afflicted with breast fetishism.

Reception
Big Breasts and Wide Hips received near universal critical acclaim from Western literary critics who praised Mo Yan's inventive storytelling and use of his unique style of magical realism to describe the surrealism the average Chinese peasant felt living under the Japanese occupation.
Contributor for The Guardian, Paul Mason declared Mo Yan to be the Chinese equivalent of Thomas Pynchon, concluding that Mo Yan was "unlike any of the great living authors."

Jonathan Yardley of The Washington Post praised Mo Yan's dedication to feminism throughout the novel, but offered numerous reservations about the quality of the novel. Most of Yardley's criticism focuses on the stale prose and clumsy characterization of Jintong.

References

Chinese historical novels
Novels by Mo Yan
1996 Chinese novels
Feminist novels
Arcade Publishing books